24 teams competed in the 2010 FIVB Women's World Championship, with two place allocated for the hosts, Japan and titleholder, Russia. In the qualification process for the 2010 FIVB World Championship, the Five FIVB confederations were allocated a share of the 22 remaining spots. The distribution is:

Qualified teams
{| class="wikitable sortable" style="text-align: left;"
|-
!width="140"|Team
!width="80"|Confederation
!width="200"|Qualified as
!width="110"|Qualified on
!width="70"|Appearancein finals
|-
|  || AVC ||  || 0116 November 2006 || 
|-
|  || CEV ||  || 0216 November 2006 || 
|-
|  || NORCECA ||  || 0314 June 2009 || 
|-
|  || NORCECA ||  || 0423 June 2009 || 
|-
|  || AVC ||  || 054 July 2009 || 
|-
|  || AVC ||  || 064 July 2009 || 
|-
|  || NORCECA ||  || 078 July 2009 || 
|-
|  || NORCECA ||  || 089 July 2009 || 
|-
|  || CAVB ||  || 0912 July 2009 || 
|-
|  || CEV ||  || 1018 July 2009 || 
|-
|  || CEV ||  || 1118 July 2009 || 
|-
|  || CEV ||  || 1218 July 2009 || 
|-
|  || CEV ||  || 1318 July 2009 || 
|-
|  || CEV ||  || 1418 July 2009 || 
|-
|  || CEV ||  || 1518 July 2009 || 
|-
|  || CEV ||  || 1619 July 2009 || 
|-
|  || CEV ||  || 1719 July 2009 || 
|-
|  || CAVB ||  || 1824 July 2009 || 
|-
|  || CSV ||  || 1925 July 2009 || 
|-
|  || CSV ||  || 2025 July 2009 || 
|-
|  || AVC ||  || 2130 August 2009 || 
|-
|  || AVC ||  || 2230 August 2009 || 
|-
|  || NORCECA ||  || 2330 August 2009 || 
|-
|  || NORCECA ||  || 2430 August 2009 || 
|}

1.Competed as Soviet Union from 1952 to 1990; 5th appearance as Russia.
2.Competed as West Germany from 1956 to 1990; 5th appearance as Germany.
3.Competed as Yugoslavia for 1978 and Serbia and Montenegro for 2006; 1st appearance as Serbia.
4.Competed as Czechoslovakia from 1952 to 1986; 3rd appearance as Czech Republic.

Confederation qualification processes

The distribution by confederation for the 2010 FIVB Volleyball Women's World Championship was:

 Asia and Oceania (AVC): 4 places (+ Japan qualified automatically as host nation for a total of 5 places)
 Africa (CAVB): 2 places
 Europe (CEV): 8 places (+ Russia qualified automatically as the defending champions for a total of 9 places)
 South America (CSV) 2 places
 North, Central America and Caribbean (NORCECA): 6 places

AVC

  (Second Round)
  (Third Round)
  (Second Round, Third Round)
  (First Round, Second Round, Third Round)
  (Second Round, Third Round)
  (First Round, Second Round, Third Round)
  (First Round)
  (Third Round)
  (Second Round, Third Round)
  (First Round)
  (Second Round, Third Round)

CAVB

  (Third Round)
  (Second Round)
  (Second Round, Third Round)
  (Third Round)
  (Third Round)
  (Second Round, Third Round)
  (Second Round)
  (Second Round)
  (Second Round, Third Round)
  (Second Round, Third Round)
  (Second Round)
  (Third Round)
  (Second Round)

CEV

  (Second Round)
  (First Round)
  (Second Round, Third Round)
  (Second Round, Third Round)
  (Second Round, Third Round)
  (First Round)
  (Second Round, Third Round)
  (Second Round, Third Round)
  (Second Round, Third Round)
  (First Round)
  (First Round)
  (Second Round)
  (Second Round, Third Round)
  (First Round)
  (Third Round)
  (First Round)
  (Second Round)
  (First Round, Second Round)
  (First Round, Second Round)
  (Third Round)
  (First Round, Second Round)
  (First Round)
  (Third Round)
  (Third Round)
  (First Round)
  (Second Round, Third Round)
  (Third Round)
  (Second Round)
  (First Round, Second Round, Third Round)
  (Second Round, Third Round)
  (Third Round)
  (Second Round)

CSV

  (Second Round, Third Round)
  (Second Round)
  (Third Round)
  (Second Round)
  (Second Round)
  (Third Round)
  (Second Round)
  (Second Round, Third Round)

NORCECA

  (First Round)
  (First Round)
  (Second Round)
  (Second Round, Third Round)
  (Second Round, Third Round)
  (Second Round)
  (First Round, Second Round)
  (First Round)
  (Third Round, Playoff Round)
  (Second Round)
  (Third Round, Playoff Round)
  (Third Round)
  (First Round)
  (Third Round)
  (Second Round)
  (First Round)
  (Second Round, Third Round)
  (Second Round)
  (Second Round)
  (Second Round, Third Round)
  (Third Round, Playoff Round)
  (Second Round, Third Round)
  (Second Round, Third Round)
  (Second Round, Third Round)
  (Third Round)
  (First Round)
  (First Round, Second Round)
  (First Round)
  (Second Round)
  (Second Round, Third Round, Playoff Round)
  (Second Round, Third Round)
  (Third Round)

References

External links
FIVB

2010 FIVB Volleyball Women's World Championship
FIVB Volleyball World Championship qualification